Otto Birger Morcken (11 October 1910 – 17 January 2009) was a Norwegian chess player, Norwegian Chess Championship winner (1956).

Biography
In the 1950s, Otto Birger Morcken was one of the leading Norwegian chess players. In 1956, he won Norwegian Chess Championship.

Otto Birger Morcken played for Norway in the Chess Olympiads:
 In 1950, at third board in the 9th Chess Olympiad in Dubrovnik (+1, =6, -6),
 In 1952, at third board in the 10th Chess Olympiad in Helsinki (+1, =2, -5),
 In 1954, at first board in the 11th Chess Olympiad in Amsterdam (+2, =5, -6),
 In 1956, at second board in the 12th Chess Olympiad in Moscow (+3, =5, -5).

References

External links

Otto Birger Morcken chess games at 365chess.com

1910 births
2009 deaths
Sportspeople from Bergen
Norwegian chess players
Chess Olympiad competitors
20th-century chess players